"Is There Someone Else?" is a song by Canadian singer the Weeknd. Released as the tenth track on his fifth studio album, Dawn FM (2022), it was written by the Weeknd, OPN, Tommy Brown and Peter Lee Johnson, and produced by the four with additional production by Max Martin and Oscar Holter. The track peaked at number 45 on the UK Singles Chart and number 31 on the Billboard Hot 100.

On the one-year anniversary of Dawn FM on January 7, 2023, a music video for "Is There Someone Else?" was released. The Weeknd performed the song during his After Hours til Dawn Tour and included it on his 2023 live album, Live at SoFi Stadium.

Composition and lyrics
The song's lyrics focus on Tesfaye's suspicion that his partner is having an affair with another man.

Music video
A music video for the song was released on January 7, 2023, as part of the one-year anniversary of the album's release. It was directed by Cliqua. In it, the Weeknd is seen watching a woman dancing seductively through an apartment window while wearing a plastic-like mask.

Charts

Certifications

References

External links
 
 
 

2022 songs
Canadian synth-pop songs
Songs written by the Weeknd
The Weeknd songs
Song recordings produced by the Weeknd
Song recordings produced by Max Martin
Republic Records singles